Richardson's Tavern is a historic Erie Canal inn and tavern located in the hamlet of Bushnell's Basin in Perinton, Monroe County, New York. Believed to be the only remaining establishment from the canal's earliest years,  it dates to about 1818 when it was a stop on the stage coach route along the Irondequoit Valley and Irondequoit Creek, between Rochester and Canandaigua.   Several expansions occurred during the 19th century.  The tavern operated as a hotel until 1917 when it was converted to four apartments. In 1978, after having been abandoned since 1972, it was converted for use as a restaurant, Richardson's Canal House.   The restaurant opened on Valentine's Day 1979.  It has become one of the most noted restaurants in the county, and has even garnered nationwide recognition.

It was listed on the National Register of Historic Places in 1980.

References

Drinking establishments on the National Register of Historic Places in New York (state)
Federal architecture in New York (state)
Buildings and structures in Monroe County, New York
Taverns in New York (state)
National Register of Historic Places in Monroe County, New York
Taverns on the National Register of Historic Places in New York (state)